Hristo Stalev (born 11 July 1985 in Plovdiv) is a Bulgarian football player. He currently plays for Chepinets Velingrad as a forward.

References

1985 births
Living people
Bulgarian footballers
Association football midfielders
FC Spartak Plovdiv players
Botev Plovdiv players
PFC Pirin Gotse Delchev players
PFC Svetkavitsa players
First Professional Football League (Bulgaria) players